The 2016 IIHF Women's U18 World Championship was the ninth Women's U18 World Championship in ice hockey. The tournament was played in St. Catharines, Canada.

Top Division

Preliminary round

Group A

Group B

Relegation series
The third and fourth placed team from Group B will play a best-of-three series to determine the relegated team.

Final round

Bracket

Quarterfinals

Semifinals

Fifth place game

Bronze medal game

Gold medal game

Final standings

Tournament awards
Best players selected by the directorate

Source: IIHF.com

Media All Stars

Statistics

Scoring leaders 

GP = Games played; G = Goals; A = Assists; Pts = Points; +/− = Plus-minus; PIM = Penalties In MinutesSource: IIHF.com

Goaltending leaders 
(minimum 40% team's total ice time)

TOI = Time on ice (minutes:seconds); GA = Goals against; GAA = Goals against average; Sv% = Save percentage; SO = ShutoutsSource: IIHF.com

Division I

Division I "A"
Was played in Miskolc, Hungary 10–16 January 2016.

Division I Qualification
Was played in Spittal an der Drau and Radenthein, Austria, January 7 to 11, 2016.  The teams were divided into two groups of four where the winners played off against each other for promotion to the 2017 Division I tournament.  The top six teams remain in the newly titled Division 1 B, Romania and Australia were relegated to the new Division I B Qualification tournament.

Group A

Group B

Seventh place game

Fifth place game

Bronze medal game

Gold medal (promotion) game

References

External links
 AllSportDB.com Event page
 IIHF.com 2016 events index
 Hockey Canada page
 Eurohockey page

World
2016
IIHF World Women's U18 Championships
IIHF World Women's U18
January 2016 sports events in Canada